Karl Werner Lothar Koch (July 22, 1965 – c. May 23, 1989) was a German hacker in the 1980s, who called himself "hagbard", after Hagbard Celine. He was involved in a Cold War computer espionage incident.

Biography
Koch was born in Hanover. He grew up under difficult circumstances. His mother died of cancer in 1976, his father had alcohol problems. Koch was interested in astronomy as a teenager and was involved in the state student's council. In 1979 Karl's father gave him the 1975 book, Illuminatus! – The Golden Apple by Robert Anton Wilson and Robert Shea, which had a very strong influence to him. From his income as a member of the state students' council, he bought his first computer in 1982 and named him: "FUCKUP" ("First Universal Cybernetic-Kinetic Ultra-Micro Programmer") after The Illuminatus! Trilogy. In August 1984 his father also died of cancer. In 1985 Koch and some other hackers founded the Computer-Stammtisch in a pub of the Hanover-Oststadt, which developed later into the Chaos Computer Club Hanover. During this time Koch came into contact with hard drugs more and more often. In February 1987 Koch broke off a vacation in Spain, because of this – and had himself admitted to a Psychiatric clinic in Aachen for rehab treatments.  He left the clinic in May 1987.

Hacking
He worked with the hackers known as DOB (Dirk-Otto Brezinski), Pengo (Hans Heinrich Hübner), and Urmel (Markus Hess), and was involved in selling hacked information from United States military computers to the KGB. Clifford Stoll's book The Cuckoo's Egg gives a first-person account of the hunt and eventual identification of Hess. Pengo and Koch subsequently came forward and confessed to the authorities under the espionage amnesty, which protected them from being prosecuted.

Death
Koch was found burned to death with gasoline in a forest near Celle, Germany. The death was officially claimed to be a suicide.

Koch left his workplace in his car to go for lunch; he had not returned by late afternoon, so his employer reported him as a missing person.

German police were alerted of an abandoned car in a forest near Celle on June 1, 1989; upon investigation, it appeared as though it had not moved for years, as it was covered in dust. The remains of Koch—at this point just bones—were discovered close by, a patch of scorched and burnt ground surrounding them, shoes missing. The scorched earth itself was controlled in a small circle around the corpse; it had not rained in some time, and the grass was perfectly dry. No suicide note was found with the body.

Despite his death being officially ruled a suicide, the unusual circumstances in which Koch's remains were found led to at least some speculation that Koch's death had not been self-inflicted; the patch of scorched ground surrounding the body was a small and seemingly controlled area, ostensibly too much so for death by self-immolation, with no suicide note having ever been found.

Karl Koch in media

Books

Movies
A German movie about his life, entitled 23, was released in 1998. While the film was critically acclaimed, it has been harshly criticized as exploitative by real-life witnesses. A corrective to the film's take is the documentation written by his friends.

In 1990, a documentary was released titled The KGB, The Computer and Me.

Music
Koch was memorialized by Clock DVA at the opening of their music video for "The Hacker" and in the liner notes for "The Hacker" on the album Buried Dreams (1989).

See also
 Boris Floricic a.k.a. Tron, a computer hacker who allegedly suffered a similar fate

References

External links 
 
 Story of a Grey Hacker
 WikiLeaks and Karl Werner Lothar Koch

1965 births
1989 suicides
German spies for the Soviet Union
People from Hanover
Suicides by self-immolation
Suicides in Germany
Hacking (computer security)
1989 deaths